The 2017–18 American International Yellow Jackets men's ice hockey season was the 70th season of play for the program, the 22nd at the Division I level, and the 15th season in the Atlantic Hockey conference. The Yellow Jackets represented American International College and were coached by Eric Lang, in his 2nd season.

Season
American International began its second season under Eric Lang rather poorly; the Yellow Jackets won just 1 of their first 9 games and looked destined to compile yet another poor record. However, in mid-November, after making freshman Stefano Durante the starting goaltender, AIC began to improve. While the offense was never strong, it was serviceable for much of the year and an improved defensive effort allowed the Yellow Jackets to start winning game more often. The team was never able to put together a long stretch of wins but, after such a bad start, .500-hockey was a vast improvement.

American International finished the season 8th in the Atlantic Hockey standings, their best result in over a decade. While they possessed a losing record, AIC managed to earn its first home playoff game since 1990. While they got a fight from Niagara, the Yellow Jackets won both games to win a postseason series for the first time in eleven years.

The 15 wins recorded on the year were the most in any one season by the program since it had joined Division I in 1999. The sizable improvement for the team was spearheaded by the addition of Brennan Kapcheck and Stefano Durante, two freshman that the program would conceivably be able to build around for the near future.

Departures

Recruiting

Roster

|}

Standings

Schedule and results

|-
!colspan=12 style=";" | Regular Season

|-
!colspan=12 style=";" | 
|- align="center" bgcolor="#e0e0e0"

|- align="center" bgcolor="#e0e0e0"
|colspan=12|American International Won Series 2–0

|- align="center" bgcolor="#e0e0e0"
|colspan=12|American International Lost Series 1–2

Scoring statistics

Goaltending statistics

Rankings

USCHO did not release a poll in Week 24.

Awards and honors

References

2017–18
American International
American International
American International
American International